The 1965 LSU Tigers football team represented Louisiana State University during the 1965 NCAA University Division football season.

Back-to-back losses to Ole Miss and Alabama by a combined 54-7 put LSU's bowl hopes in peril, but wins vs. Mississippi State and Tulane prompted the Cotton Bowl to extend a bid to the 7-3 Tigers. The bowl's faith in LSU was rewarded when the Tigers stunned No. 2 Arkansas 14–7 to stop the Razorbacks' winning streak at 22 and deny Arkansas a second consecutive national championship.

Schedule
Destruction from Hurricane Betsy on September 10 put the season opener vs. Texas A&M in jeopardy. Repairs to the light towers, scoreboard and press box were made in time for the game to proceed as planned eight days later.

LSU defeated rival Tulane by a 62-0 tally for the third time in eight seasons (1958 and 1961) in the Green Wave's final football game as a member of the Southeastern Conference.  It was also LSU's third consecutive shutout of Tulane at Baton Rouge.

References

LSU
LSU Tigers football seasons
Cotton Bowl Classic champion seasons
LSU Tigers football